St Edmund's Catholic School is a coeducational Roman Catholic secondary school, located in Portsmouth in the English county of Hampshire.

It is a voluntary aided school in the trusteeship of the Roman Catholic Diocese of Portsmouth, and is maintained by Portsmouth City Council. The school is named after Saint Edmund Rich, a 13th-century Archbishop of Canterbury.

St Edmund's Catholic School offers GCSEs, BTECs and OCR Nationals as programmes of study for pupils.

References

External links
St Edmund's Catholic School official website

Secondary schools in Portsmouth
Catholic secondary schools in the Diocese of Portsmouth
Voluntary aided schools in England